The Embassy of Sweden in New Delhi is Sweden's diplomatic mission in India. The Embassy is headed by the Ambassador of Sweden to India. The Embassy is situated in Chanakyapuri, the diplomatic enclave of New Delhi, where most of the embassies in India are located. The Embassy is also responsible for the Swedish honorary consulates in India, located in Kolkata, Chennai and Mumbai, and also the diplomatic relationship with Nepal and Maldives. The Ambassador of New Delhi is also accredited to Sri Lanka, Nepal, Bhutan and Maldives.

History
The Swedish mission in India was opened in 1949 and was then located at the Cecil Hôtel in New Delhi. From 1950, it was located at 11 Ratendone Road in New Delhi. In 1956, the mission was still located at 11 Ratendone Road and the chancellery was located at 27 Prithviraj Road. In 1957, the mission was located at 22 Hardinge Avenue and the chancellery was still located at 27 Prithviraj Road. From 1 June 1959, the address was Diplomatic Enclave, New Delhi.

The current embassy building was inaugurated in November 1959 in the presence of the then Prime Minister of India, Jawaharlal Nehru. The embassy building was designed by Swedish architects Sune Lindström and Jöran Curman. The 40,000 square meters of greenspace surrounding the embassy was landscaped by Walter Bauer. Once the embassy building, including the Ambassador's residence reception rooms, staff housing and recreational areas were completed, it was formally handed over to the first Swedish Ambassador Alva Myrdal. The Swedish organization SIDA moved into a new extension in the embassy area in 1988-89. The National Property Board of Sweden replaced the windows and doors in the accommodation buildings in 2005-06. In 2009, the Swedish Trade Council got new, larger offices and separate entrance in the embassy area.

Heads of Mission

See also
India–Sweden relations
List of diplomatic missions in India
List of diplomatic missions of Sweden

References 

Diplomatic missions of Sweden
Diplomatic missions in New Delhi
India–Sweden relations